The Belgian American Educational Foundation (BAEF) is an educational charity. It supports the exchange of university students, scientists and scholars between the United States and Belgium. The foundation fosters the higher education of deserving Belgians and Americans through its exchange-fellowship program. Since 1977, Dr. Emile Boulpaep is the president of the BAEF.

History
During World War I, from October 1914, Herbert Hoover organized the Committee for Relief in Belgium (USA) and the Commission for Relief in Belgium (Belgium). After the war, the University Foundation, and on 9 January 1920, the B.A.E.F., were founded with the budget remaining in the hands of the commission after five years of relief work. The Belgian American Educational Foundation became the heir of the Commission for Relief in Belgium.

After World War I, the BAEF invested in land and buildings for the Université libre de Bruxelles (Solbosch campus) and also for rebuilding the library of the Catholic University of Leuven. In 1925, the BAEF founded the Hoover Foundation for the Development of the University of Brussels and the Hoover Foundation for the Development of the University of Leuven. The BAEF started providing scholarships for students study abroad.

Today, the Hoover Foundation is still divided into two entities: one is still dedicated to the Université libre de Bruxelles (ULB) and Vrije Universiteit Brussel (VUB) in Brussels and the second and biggest one is dedicated to the development of the University of Louvain (UCLouvain) primarily in Louvain-la-Neuve and Brussels, and the KU Leuven in Leuven.

Notable alumni
 Georges Lemaître
 Emile Boulpaep
 Karel Bossart
 Lotte Brand Philip
 Eva Brems
 Albert Claude
 Alexander De Croo
 Gaston Eyskens
 Mark Eyskens
 Corneille Heymans
 Jean Charles Snoy et d'Oppuers
 Denis Wirtz
 Pierre Wigny

See also
 Emile Francqui
 Herbert Hoover
 Prince Albert Fund
 Olivaint Conference of Belgium
 Paul Dana
 Academic mobility
 American Relief Administration (ARA)
 Commission for Relief in Belgium
 EducationUSA
 Effect of World War I on Children in the United States
 ERASMUS programme (European Union)
 Fulbright Program (United States)
 Hoover Chair
 Jean Cattier
 Felicien Cattier

References

External links
 Belgian American Educational Foundation
 Hoover's legacy in Belgium

Foundations based in Belgium
Academic transfer
Education finance
Student financial aid
Scholarships
Belgium–United States relations